SC Zofingen is a Swiss football club based in Zofingen, Canton Aargau which is a short distance from Zürich. It was founded on 10 August 1896. They currently play in the Swiss 1. Liga, the third tier of Swiss football.

History
In 1971 the club were promoted to the Challenge League, the 2nd tier of the Swiss football pyramid. In 1973 the club were relegated to the third tier and the following year into the fourth tier. In 1984 the club were promoted to the Swiss 1. Liga. In 1989 the club won the Swiss 1. Liga but could not move into the Challenge League as their stadium was not good enough. In 1990 the club were again champions of the Swiss 1. Liga but failed to win the play off match and so were not promoted. In a dramatic game against FC Kölliken in Lenzburg the club missed a penalty and eventually lost 1–0.

Current squad

Stadium
The club play at Sportanlagen Trinermatten, which opened in 1974. The stadium has one covered grandstand with seating for 670.

External links
  
 Soccerway profile 
 football.ch profile 

Football clubs in Switzerland
Association football clubs established in 1896
SC Zofingen
SC Zofingen